Orange County Sheriff's Office may refer to:

Orange County Sheriff's Office (Florida)
Orange County Sheriff's Office (New York)
Orange County Sheriff's Office (North Carolina), see List of law enforcement agencies in North Carolina

See also 
Orange County Sheriff's Department (disambiguation)